The Emites ( or ) or Emim ( ʾĒmīm) was the Moabite name for Repha'im. They are described in the Book of Deuteronomy, chapter 2 as having been a powerful and populous people. They were defeated by the Moabites, who occupied their land.  The Emim are also mentioned in Genesis  and according to Rashi, the name is translated as "the dreaded ones" (Hertz 1936) and the singular Ema/Emma (Hebrew: אימה) means "horror" or "terror".

References
J.H. Hertz (1936) The Pentateuch and Haftoras. Deuteronomy. Oxford, Oxford University Press.

Book of Deuteronomy
Book of Genesis
Giants in the Hebrew Bible
Hebrew Bible nations
Rephaites